Olamide David (– 18 January 2016) was a Nigerian  male child actor best known for playing a lead role in the movie Cobweb. He won the "Best Male Actor Award" at the 2015 edition of the Best of Nollywood Awards after he had been previously nominated in the same category at the 2013 and 2014 editions. As well as Cobweb he had roles in a number of other feature films, including The Black Silhouette.

On 18 January 2016, Olamide died at Ikeja General Hospital after sustaining a fatal abdominal injury while playing football.

References

2001 births
2016 deaths
Male actors in Yoruba cinema
Male actors from Lagos State
Yoruba male actors
Nigerian male child actors
21st-century Nigerian male actors
Sport deaths in Nigeria
Nigerian male television actors